The Armthorpe Academy (formerly Armthorpe School) is  a secondary school located in Armthorpe, Doncaster, England.

History 

The school was opened in 1842 as a National school, and was converted into an Academy in 2012.

References 

Secondary schools in Doncaster
Academies in Doncaster
1842 establishments in England
Educational institutions established in 1842